Dallas is the ninth-most populous city in the United States and the third-most populous in the state of Texas.

Dallas may also refer to:

Places

Australia 
 Dallas, Victoria, a suburb near Melbourne

Canada 
 Dallas, Kamloops, British Columbia, a neighbourhood of the city of Kamloops
 Dallas Road, an important thoroughfare in Victoria, British Columbia
 Dallas/Red Rose, Manitoba, a small town

Scotland 
 Dallas, Moray

United States 
 Dallas, Arkansas
 Dallas, Colorado
 Dallas, Georgia
 Dallas, Iowa
 Dallas, North Carolina
 Dallas, Oregon
 Dallas, Pennsylvania
 Dallas, South Dakota
 Dallas, West Virginia
 Dallas, Wisconsin, a village within the town below
 Dallas (town), Wisconsin
 Dallas Plantation, Maine
 Marble Hill, Missouri, formerly known as Dallas
 Bethany, Missouri, formerly known as Dallas
 Dallas County (disambiguation)
 Dallas Township (disambiguation)

Outer space
 8084 Dallas, an asteroid

Naval vessels 
 , the name of two commissioned and two cancelled ships
 USCGC Dallas, the name of various United States Coast Guard and United States Revenue Cutter Service ships

People
 Dallas (name), a given name and surname
 Dallas, a female professional wrestler from the Gorgeous Ladies of Wrestling
 Dallas, a member of the TV show American Gladiators

Arts and entertainment

Films 
 Dallas (film),  a 1950 Warner Bros. Western 
 Dallas (Alien), the captain of the Nostromo in the 1979 movie Alien

Music 
 Dallas Records, a Croatian record label
 Dallas (album), a 2002 album by Randy Meisner
 "Dallas" (Connie Smith song), a 1974 country music song by Connie Smith
 "Dallas" (Alan Jackson song), a 1991 country music song by Alan Jackson
 "Dallas" (Steely Dan song), the first single of jazz-rock band Steely Dan
 "Dallas", a song from Jimmy Buffett's 1974 album A1A
 "Dallas", a song from Joe Ely's 1981 album Musta Notta Gotta Lotta

Television 
 Dallas (1978 TV series), a 1978–1991 U.S. prime-time soap opera
 Dallas (2012 TV series), a 2012–2014 revival of the 1978 series
 Dallas, a recurring minor character in the U.S. family sitcom Austin & Ally
 Dallas Royce, a character in the U.S. TV series Suburgatory

Other uses
 Dallas (role-playing game), a 1980 role-playing game based on the TV show
 The Umbrella Academy: Dallas, the second volume of The Umbrella Academy comic book series

Other uses 
 Dallas (jeep), a French car made from 1980s to 1998
 Dallas Semiconductor, now a subsidiary of Maxim Integrated Products

See also 
 Dallas Divide, a high mountain pass in Colorado, U.S.
 Dallas Plantation, Maine, U.S.
 Dallastown, Pennsylvania, U.S.
 Dalles (disambiguation)
 Dellys, Algeria
 Fort Dallas, near Miami, Florida, U.S.
 Melcher-Dallas, Iowa, US, formed from merger the cities of Dallas and Melcher in 1986